Joep Wennemars (born 3 October 2002) is a Dutch speed skater who specializes in the sprint distances.

Career
Wennemars won the 2022 World Junior Speed Skating Championships at the 	Eisschnelllaufbahn Innsbruck in Austria. He made his ISU Speed Skating World Cup debut in November 2022 at the Sørmarka Arena in Stavanger, Norway where he finished seventh in the 500 m in Division B, resulting in a promotion to Division A.  At the second World Cup event, held at the Thialf in Heerenveen, he finished in second place in Division A behind Ning Zhongyan in a personal record of 1:08.08.

Wennemars is part of Team Jumbo-Visma and is under contract until 2024.

Personal records

References

External links
 

2002 births
Living people
Dutch male speed skaters
People from Dalfsen
21st-century Dutch people